Lemon is the stage name of Christopher Baptista (born September 1, 1995), a Canadian drag performer most known for competing on the first season of Canada's Drag Race (2020) and later the first season of RuPaul's Drag Race: UK vs the World (2022).

Education
Lemon relocated from Toronto to New York City at the age of 19 to study dance at the Ailey School.

Career
Lemon started doing drag in New York City. She competed as the only U.S.-based contestant on the first season of Canada's Drag Race. In the first episode of the season, she placed in the bottom two, but was saved from elimination after winning a lip sync battle against Juice Boxx to Carly Rae Jepsen's "I Really Like You". Lemon subsequently won the main challenges in episode 2 and episode 7, before being eliminated from the competition in episode 8 following a lip sync against Rita Baga to Alanis Morissette's "You Oughta Know", ultimately placing fifth overall. Lemon portrayed Jojo Siwa during the Snatch Game episode.

Sasha Velour invited Lemon to model in her New York Fashion Week collaboration with Opening Ceremony.

In 2021, Lemon was a featured performer in "Come Through", a single by her Canada's Drag Race cast-mate Priyanka.

In January 2022, she was announced as one of the nine contestants on RuPaul's Drag Race: UK vs the World. In the premiere episode, she landed in the bottom two alongside Janey Jacké, and was sent home by Pangina Heals, finishing the competition in ninth place.

Personal life
Originally from Toronto, Lemon has lived in New York City for several years.

Filmography

Television

Awards and nominations

References

External links
 

1995 births
Living people
21st-century Canadian LGBT people
Canadian drag queens
Canada's Drag Race contestants
People from New York City
People from Toronto